Jill Brukman (born 8 March 1973) is a former backstroke and medley swimmer from South Africa. She competed for her native country at the 1992 Summer Olympics in Barcelona, Spain, swimming a total number of four events. Brukman didn't reach the final in any of those starts.

References
sports-reference

1973 births
Living people
South African female swimmers
Olympic swimmers of South Africa
Swimmers at the 1992 Summer Olympics
Female medley swimmers
French female backstroke swimmers
African Games medalists in swimming
Competitors at the 1995 All-Africa Games
African Games gold medalists for South Africa
African Games bronze medalists for South Africa